Koch may refer to:

People
 Koch (surname), people with this surname
 Koch dynasty, a dynasty in Assam and Bengal, north east India
 Koch family
 Koch people (or Koche), an ethnic group originally from the ancient Koch kingdom in north east India
 Koch languages, Sino-Tibetan language family
 Koch language, a language spoken in India and Bangladesh
 Koch, an alternate name of the Rabha people, in northeast India and surrounding countries
Rabha language, their language
 Koch Kingdom, in and around Assam

Places 
 Koch (crater), a crater on the Moon
 Koch, Iran (disambiguation), places in Iran
 Koch, Łódź Voivodeship, a village in central Poland
 Koch, Mississippi, United States
 Koch, South Sudan, a village in Unity State, South Sudan
 Koch Bihar, a princely state in north east India
 Koch County, an administrative area in Unity State, South Sudan
 Koch Kingdom, Assam, 13th-16th centuries

Businesses 
 Koch Entertainment LP, now known as E1 Entertainment
 Koch Records, former name of Entertainment One Music
 Koch Industries, petroleum, chemicals, energy, and commodities trading
 Koch Media, a media distribution company from Germany
Koch Foods Poultry processor and distributor.

Other uses
 Koch (boat), a type of Arctic boat 
 Koch method of learning Morse Code
 Koch snowflake or star, and Koch curve
 Koch's triangle, an anatomical area of the Human heart
 Koch's postulates, the criteria required to establish the etiology of an infectious disease
 Mycobacterium tuberculosis (Koch's bacillus), a bacterial species that causes tuberculosis
 Koch (film), a 2012 documentary film about New York City mayor Ed Koch

See also 
 Heckler & Koch, maker of firearms
 Koch Institute (disambiguation)
 Kotch, a 1971 film starring Walter Matthau
Coke (disambiguation), a homophone of some pronunciations of Koch

Language and nationality disambiguation pages